San Lorenzo is a town on the north coast of Ecuador, about 18 km south of the Colombian border. It was joined  by a narrow gauge rail to the city of Ibarra in the Highlands and for many years it was an important port for the export of balsa wood and tagua.

As of 2022 San Lorenzo has a population of approximately 28,123 people.

Populated places in Esmeraldas Province